The 2009 APRA Silver Scroll Awards were held on Thursday, September 17, 2009, at the Christchurch Town Hall, celebrating excellence in New Zealand songwriting. The Silver Scroll Award was presented to James Milne and Luke Buda for the Lawrence Arabia song "Apple Pie Bed", and musicians and academics Hirini Melbourne and Richard Nunns were inducted into the New Zealand Music Hall of Fame.

Silver Scroll Award 

The Silver Scroll Award celebrates outstanding achievement in the songwriting of original New Zealand pop music. The evening's music performances were again produced by Don McGlashan.  Each of the nominated songs were covered in a new style by another artist.

Long list 

In July 2009 a top-20 long list was announced.

James Milne and Luke Buda "Apple Pie Bed" (Lawrence Arabia)
Oliver Gordon, Nick Major, Michael Carpinter, Stephen Small and Jasper De Roos "Closer To Home" (Autozamm)
Phil Madsen "Dancing On The Moon" (Phil Madsen)
Shayne Carter "Degrees Of Existence" (Dimmer)
Peter Wadams, Sam Hansen and Vince Harder "Everything" (P-Money feat. Vince Harder)
Dann Hume and Jon Hume "Hey Boys And Girls" (Evermore)
Dave Dobbyn "Howling At The Moon" (Dave Dobbyn)
Kody Nielson & Ruban Nielson "I Can't Stop Being Foolish" (The Mint Chicks)
Jess Chambers "Island" (Jess Chambers)
Reb Fountain "January's Well" (Reb Fountain)
Jamie Greenslade "Lotaluv" (Maitreya)
Dave Gibson & Justyn Pilbrow "Louder Louder" (Elemeno P)
David Atai, Te Awanui Reeder, Donald McNulty, Heath Manukau, Junior Rikiau, Feleti Strickson-Pua and Che Ness "Mr Mista" (Nesian Mystik)
Eden Mulholland "Oldest Trick In The Book" (Motocade)
James Christmas & Barry Palmer "On My Mind" (Luger Boa)
Julia Deans, Andrew Bain & Simon Braxton "Silences & Distances" (Fur Patrol)
Jeremy Redmore, Simon Oscroft, Matthew Warman, Aidan Bartlett and Nick Campbell "The Letter" (Midnight Youth)
Andrew Spraggon & Iva Lamkum "Turn Around" (Sola Rosa)
Matt Barus "Vampires" (Dukes)
Ruth Carr, Paul Dodge & Ryan Beehre "Wayho" (Minuit)

New Zealand Music Hall of Fame 

Musicians the late Hirini Melbourne and Richard Nunns were inducted into the New Zealand Music Hall of Fame. Both were known for their work with traditional Maori instruments. Melbourne was a composer, singer and respected academic, and Nunns is considered the leading authority on taonga pūoro. Moana and the Tribe performed a song written by Melbourne.

Other awards 

Four other awards were presented at the Silver Scroll Awards: APRA Maioha Award (for excellence in contemporary Maori music), SOUNZ Contemporary Award (for creativity and inspiration in classical composition) and two awards acknowledging songs with the most radio and television play in New Zealand and overseas.

APRA Maioha Award

SOUNZ Contemporary Award

Most Performed Works

APRA song awards 

Outside of the Silver Scroll Awards, APRA presented four genre awards in 2009. The APRA Best Pacific Song was presented at the Pacific Music Awards, the APRA Best Country Music Song was presented at the New Zealand Country Music Awards and the APRA Children’s Song of the Year and What Now Video of the Year were presented at StarFest.

References 

New Zealand music awards
APRA